245 (two hundred [and] forty-five) is the natural number following 244 and preceding 246.

Additionally, 245 is:
a composite number.
a stella octangula number.
palindromic in bases 34 (7734) and 48 (5548)
a Harshad number in bases 7, 9, 11, 15, 31, 35, 36 (and 14 other bases).
the aliquot sum of any of these numbers: 723, 1195, 2563, 3859, 
part of the 97-aliquot tree.  4624, 4893, 2595, 1581, 723, 245,

References 

Integers